The 22nd AVN Awards ceremony, presented by Adult Video News (AVN), took place January 8, 2005 at the Venetian Hotel Grand Ballroom, at Paradise, Nevada, U.S.A. During the ceremony, AVN presented AVN Awards (commonly referred to as Oscars of porn) in nearly 100 categories honoring the best pornographic films released between Oct. 1, 2003 to Sept. 30, 2004. The ceremony, televised in the United States by Playboy TV, was produced and directed by Gary Miller. Comedian Thea Vidale hosted the show for the first time with adult film star Savanna Samson.

The Masseuse won the most awards on the night with seven, including Best Film. The Collector won four awards. Other winners included: Bella Loves Jenna, In the Garden of Shadows, 1 Night in Paris and Stuntgirl with three wins apiece.

Winners and nominees

The nominees for the 22nd AVN Awards were announced on November 12, 2004. The Masseuse and The Collector received the most nominations with 16 each; Misty Beethoven: The Musical was next with 15.

The winners were announced during the awards ceremony on January 8, 2005. Adult film star Jenna Jameson was the year's biggest winner. Besides starring in both Best Film winner The Masseuse and Best Video Feature winner Bella Loves Jenna, she won individual awards for Best Actress–Film, Best All-Girl Sex Scene–Film and Best Couples Sex Scene–Film, all for The Masseuse.

Major awards

Winners are listed first, highlighted in boldface, and indicated with a double dagger.

Additional Award Winners 
These awards were announced, but not presented, in two pre-recorded winners-only segments during the event. Trophies were given to the recipients off-stage:

DIRECTOR AWARDS
 Best Director—Foreign Release: Narcis Bosch, Hot Rats
 Best Director—Non-Feature: Jack the Zipper, Stuntgirl

MARKETING AWARDS
 Best DVD Packaging: Millionaire, Private North America/Pure Play
 Best Marketing Website: Evil Angel.com
 Best Overall Marketing Campaign—Company Image: ClubJenna
 Best Overall Marketing Campaign—Individual Project: 1 Night in Paris, Red Light District
 Best Retail Website: Adult DVD Empire.com and [WantedList |Wanted List.com] (tie)
 Best VHS Packaging: Island Fever 3, Digital Playground

PERFORMER AWARDS
 Best Male Newcomer: Tommy Gunn
 Best Non-Sex Performance: Mike Horner, The Collector
 Best Supporting Actor—Film: Rod Fontana, The 8th Sin
 Best Supporting Actor—Video: Randy Spears, Fluff and Fold
 Best Supporting Actress—Film: Lesley Zen, Bare Stage
 Best Tease Performance: Vicky Vette, Metropolis
 Female Foreign Performer of the Year: Katsumi
 Male Foreign Performer of the Year: Steve Holmes
 Transsexual Performer of the Year: Vicki Richter

PRODUCTION AWARDS'
 Best Amateur Series: Homegrown Video
 Best Classic DVD: Deep Throat (Remastered)

Production (ctd.)
 Best Sex Comedy: Misty Beethoven: The Musical

SEX SCENE AWARDS
 Best All-Girl Sex Scene—Film: Jenna Jameson, Savanna Samson, The Masseuse
 Best Group Sex Scene—Film: Katsumi, Savanna Samson, Alec Metro, Dual Identity
 Best Group Sex Scene—Video: Venus, Ariana Jollee, Staci Thorn, Zena, Louisa, Trinity, Jasmine, Nike, Melanie X, Bishop, D. Wise, Julian St. Jox, L.T., Mark Anthony, Tyler Knight, 2 others, Orgy World: The Next Level 7
 Best Oral Sex Scene—Film: Jessica Drake, Chris Cannon, Cheyne Collins, The Collector
 Best Oral Sex Scene—Video: Ava Devine, Francesca Le, Guy DiSilva, Rod Fontana, Steven French, Scott Lyons, Mario Rossi, Arnold Schwarzenpecker, Cum Swallowing Whores 2
 Best Sex Scene in a Foreign-Shot Production: Anna, Auxanna, Camilla, Daria, Gianna, Katia, Linda, Venus, Maria, Victoria, Rocco Siffredi, Rocco Ravishes Russia
 Best Solo Sex Scene: Penny Flame, Repo Girl
 Most Outrageous Sex Scene: Chloe, Ava Vincent and Randy Spears in “Randy’s Singing Penis,” Misty Beethoven: The Musical

TECHNICAL AWARDS
 Best Cinematography: Andrew Blake, Flirts
 Best Editing—Film: Sonny Malone, The Masseuse
 Best Editing—Video: Justin Sterling, Bella Loves Jenna
 Best Music: Lloyd Banks, Groupie Love
 Best Screenplay—Film: Brad Armstrong, The Collector

Honorary AVN Awards

Reuben Sturman Award
 Harry Mohney, Déjà Vu Showgirls

Hall of Fame
AVN Hall of Fame inductees for 2005 were: James Avalon, Seymore Butts, Rod Fontana, Kylie Ireland, C. J. Laing, Francesca Lé, Mai Lin, Jim Powers, Serenity, Shane, Steven St. Croix, Taylor Wane

Multiple nominations and awards

The following releases received the most nominations.

 The following 14 releases received multiple awards:

Presenters and performers
The following individuals, listed in order of appearance, presented awards or performed musical numbers or comedy.

Presenters

Performers

Ceremony information 

Two new categories were announced for this year's show – Best Interracial Release and Best P.O.V. Release. However, two other categories had insufficient entries to warrant a competition: Best Anal Sex Scene – Film and Adult Video Nudes, the latter for the worst release of the year. With the advent of digital video, emphasis started to shift to shot-on-video awards from shot-on-film awards. For the first time, the final award of the night was the Best Video Feature award, whereas in the past it had been the Best Film award. As well, the award for Best Supporting Actress—Video was moved on-stage into the main body of the awards show while the Best Supporting Actor—Film and Best Supporting Actress—Video awards were moved into the announcements segment with awards given off-stage.

The show was plagued by several glitches and miscues. Among them, the most noticeable one came when [[Sean Michaels (actor)}|Sean Michaels]] announced the winner for Best Actress—Film as being Savanna Samson instead of the correct winner, Jenna Jameson. He and co-presenter Jessica Jaymes tried to correct the error but were drowned out by the orchestra and Samson, who, as co-host, was in the wings changing costumes, ran onstage in a towel to collect the award. When told apologetically by Jaymes of the mistake, in an epic wardrobe malfunction, Samson dropped the towel and exited naked back to the off-stage changing area.

Earlier during the show, when Lit launched into its song, "My Own Worst Enemy", Jeremy Popoff knocked over his amplifier when he started playing and the musical performance was cut short. Lit came on again at the end of the show to redo the song so it would be recorded properly for television.

Besides being recorded for broadcast on Playboy TV, a DVD of the awards show was also issued by Devil's Film.

Performance of year's movies

The Paris Hilton sex tape, 1 Night in Paris, was announced as the adult movie industry's top selling movie and the top renting movie of the previous year.

Critical reviews

London's Men's World magazine gave the show a positive review, calling comedian Thea Vidale "a hilarious host" and adding, "it was clear that the 2005 AVN Awards had been a big hit; it was quicker, slicker and better than previous years." The magazine also noted how well-dressed everyone was for the event, stating, "When the U.S. porn biz does glam, it does it 110 per cent." It concluded, "With music from Smash Mouth and rapper Chingy, it was a good evening, made better by the use of high speed video scrolls to list the many award categories that would bore an audience if they were done live (best packaging?), and little video vignettes including a comedy cracker about Ron Jeremy, which saw him playing the violin while 'factoids' popped up on-screen."

Video reviewer Denny Recob similarly enjoyed the show: "The first thing I noticed about this year's show is the comedian was outstanding. Her jokes were funny and topical and she actually knew the correct porn slang and knew the correct pronunciation of the stars' names. This is a big improvement from previous years."

In Memoriam

AVN founder Paul Fishbein dedicated the show to two people who died in the previous year: Filmmaker Russ Meyer and film historian and director Jim Holliday.

See also

 AVN Award
 AVN Best New Starlet Award
 AVN Award for Male Performer of the Year
 AVN Award for Male Foreign Performer of the Year
 AVN Female Performer of the Year Award
 List of members of the AVN Hall of Fame
 2005 GayVN Awards

Notes

References

External links
 
 2005 AVN Award nominees (archived at Wayback Machine, November 11, 2004)
 2005 AVN Award Winners  Wayback Machine, January 27, 2005)
 Adult Video News Awards  at the Internet Movie Database
 
 
 

AVN Awards
2004 film awards